Pseudotatia parva is a species of catfish (order Siluriformes) of the family Auchenipteridae. It is the only species of the genus Pseudotatia. This species originates from the São Francisco River basin of Brazil.

References

Auchenipteridae
Fish of the São Francisco River basin
Taxa named by Gerlof Mees
Fish described in 1974